Philippine Air Force Citizenship Advancement Training is a citizenship advancement training program in the Philippines. It is comparable to the Aerospace Cadets of the Philippines both are under the command hierarchy of the Philippine Air Force.

Curriculum
The current program of instruction for PAF-CAT is 40% Aviation Education, and 60% Leadership, Citizenship and Military training.

Aviation education
Under Aviation Education, students learn about the history of Aviation and current advancements in the field of Aviation technology. It also covers Philippine Aviation, and Philippine Air Force heroes (i.e. Jesús Villamor, Danilo Atienza, César Basa and Antonio Bautista)

Logo

Symbolism

Triangle – this represents the "holistic" personality of the youth, death, loyalty, injustice, and purity to serve God, country and others.
Three Sides – represent the three domains in the total formation of the youth: knowledge, skills and values.
Three Stars – the three geographical divisions of the Philippines: Luzon, the Visayas and Mindanao.
The Spaceship at the center of the Philippine map – the desire to stimulate the youth's dreams and aspirations to promote the aviation industry, hand-in-hand with the country's economic development and industrialization.

Colors

White – honor, integrity, purity.
Blue – patriotism, loyalty.
Red – courage, bravery.
Yellow – charity, truth, love.
Green – justice, hope and awareness

Leadership
Students learn to value leadership by respecting their commanding officers, majority of which are students themselves who have earned their rank through training after school hours. Officers, likewise, have to learn not to abuse their power and learn humility, as well as leading by example.

These are the ranks of PAF-CAT, from highest to lowest:

Cadet Colonel (C/COL)
Cadet Lieutenant Colonel (C/LT COL)
Cadet Major (C/MAJ)
Cadet Captain (C/CPT)
Cadet First Lieutenant (C/1LT)
Cadet Second Lieutenant (C/2LT)
Cadet Probationary Second Lieutenant (C/P2LT)
Cadet Master Sergeant (C/MSG)
Cadet Technical Sergeant (C/TSG)
Cadet Staff Sergeant (C/SSG)
Cadet Sergeant (C/SGT)
Cadet Airman/Airwoman First Class (C/A1C, C/AW1C)
Cadet Airman/Airwoman Second Class (C/A2C, C/AW2C)
Cadet Airman/Airwoman (C/AM, C/AW)
Cadet New Recruit (C/NR)

However, it is also possible to become a medic, flag bearer (also known as a guidon bearer), or member of the Air Police or marching band of the PAF-CAT. Most students begin at the lowest rank, Cadet New Recruit, when they begin PAF-CAT at their school. It is possible for a Cadet to ascend in ranks if the Cadet's performance is excellent, and it is also possible to receive demotions and lower the rank of a Cadet if he performs poorly or disrespects his commanding officer.

Citizenship
Cadets in the PAF-CAT learn patriotism and pride in their nationality, and are punished for disrespecting their homeland, the Philippines. For example, Cadets are punished if they run during the playing or singing of the Philippine National Anthem. Cadets are likewise punished even more severely for disrespecting the Philippine Flag (letting any portion of the flag touch the ground is worthy of a demotion). Cadets are encouraged to sing the National Anthem with pride. Cadets are also encouraged to recite the Panatang Makabayan and the Panunumpa ng Katapatan sa Watawat, as well as sing their school's alma mater song with zest and valor.

Military training
Being an extension of the Philippine Air Force, PAF-CAT requires students to learn military commands, drills, punishments, the military alphabet, and obedience to the commanding officer. Commands are mostly in Tagalog, such as "Manumbalik", "Humanay", "Tikas", "Paluwag", "Pasulong", "Lihis pakanan/pakaliwa", "Liko pakanan/pakaliwa", "Kaliwang/kanang panig". Cadets also learn how to handle a shovel (however, toys are forbidden in schools, so replicas of shovels are used instead), and the proper use of sticks. PAF-CAT requires students to wear a Clown suit (known in some schools as General Officers Attire or GOAT, and in others as General Officers Uniform or GOU), which is inspected every training day (this includes the proper military haircut of the boys and hair do for girls). Also, PAF-CAT cadets have their own Cadet Oath and Honor Code, which  must be memorized.

This form of military training is said to give a sense of nationalism and instill self-discipline (the highest form of discipline) in the youth. It is currently so that the youth can be of service to the Philippines.

See also
 Philippine Air Force

Philippine Air Force